In condensed-matter physics, Coulombic explosions are a mechanism for transforming energy in intense electromagnetic fields into atomic motion and are thus useful for controlled destruction of relatively robust molecules.  The explosions are a prominent technique in laser-based machining, and appear naturally in certain high-energy reactions.

Mechanism
The Coulombic repulsion of particles having the same electric charge can break the bonds that hold solids together. When done with a narrow laser beam, a small amount of solid explodes into a plasma of ionized atomic particles. It may be shown that the Coulomb explosion
occurs in the same critical parameter regime as the superradiant phase transition i.e. when the destabilizing interactions become overwhelming and dominate over the native oscillatory phonon solid cluster binding motions which is also characteristic for the diamond synthesis.

With their low mass, outer valence electrons responsible for chemical bonding are easily stripped from atoms, leaving them positively charged.  Given a mutually repulsive state between atoms whose chemical bonds are broken, the material explodes into a small plasma cloud of energetic ions with higher velocities than seen in thermal emission.

Technological use
A Coulomb explosion is a "cold" alternative to the dominant laser etching technique of thermal ablation, which depends on local heating, melting, and vaporization of molecules and atoms using less-intense beams.  Pulse brevity down only to the nanosecond regime is sufficient to localize thermal ablation – before the heat is conducted far, the energy input (pulse) has ended.  Nevertheless, thermally ablated materials may seal pores important in catalysis or battery operation, and recrystallize or even burn the substrate, thus changing the physical and chemical properties at the etch site. In contrast, even light foams remain unsealed after ablation by Coulomb explosion.

Coulomb explosions for industrial machining are made with ultra-short (picosecond or femtoseconds) laser pulses.  The enormous beam intensities required (10–400 terawatt per square centimeter thresholds, depending on material) are only practical to generate, shape, and deliver for very brief instants of time.  Coulomb explosion etching can be used in any material to bore holes, remove surface layers, and texture and microstructure surfaces; e.g., to control ink loading in printing presses.

Appearance in nature
High speed camera imaging of alkali metals exploding in water has suggested the explosion is a coulomb explosion.

During a nuclear explosion based on the fission of uranium, 167 MeV is emitted in the form of a coulombic explosion between each prior nucleus of uranium, the repulsive electrostatic energy between the two fission daughter nuclei,  translates into the kinetic energy of the fission products that results in both the primary driver of the blackbody radiation that rapidly generates the hot dense plasma/nuclear fireball formation and thus also both later blast and thermal effects.

At least one scientific paper suggests that coulomb explosion (specifically, the electrostatic repulsion of dissociated carboxyl groups of polyglutamic acid) may be part of the explosive action of nematocytes, the stinging cells in aquatic organisms of the phylum Cnidaria.

Coulomb Explosion Imaging

Molecules are held together by a balance of charge between negative electrons and positive nuclei. When multiple electrons are expelled, either by laser irradiation or bombardment using highly charged ions, the remaining, mutually repulsive, nuclei fly apart in a Coulomb explosion. The structure of simple gas phase molecules can be determined by tracking the fragment trajectories. As of 2022 the method can work with up to 11-atom molecules.

See also
 Laser engraving
 Laser ablation
 Laser cutting
 Tunnel ionization
 List of plasma (physics) articles
 Coherent x-ray diffraction imaging

References

Materials science
Laser applications
Electrostatics
Explosions